Marcus Daniell and Marcelo Demoliner were the defending champions but chose not to defend their title.

Philipp Petzschner and Alexander Peya won the title after defeating Radu Albot and Matthew Ebden 6–2, 6–4 in the final.

Seeds

Draw

References
 Main Draw

Irving Tennis Classic - Doubles
2018 Doubles